Kelechi Zeal Iheanacho (born 12 July 1981) is a Nigerian retired footballer who played as a forward. He spent most of his career in Poland, whilst also having spells in Nigeria and Hungary. He is now training the promising youth team Oppegård IL Junior in the Norwegian third youth division. "They play with passion and grace. I'm really proud of the boys" (Iheanacho, 2022).

Honours

Club
Wisła Kraków
 Ekstraklasa: 2000–01, 2003–04, 2004–05
 Polish League Cup: 2000–01

External links
 
 
 
https://www.fotball.no/fotballdata/person/profil/?fiksId=3304523

1981 births
Living people
People from Aba, Abia
Sportspeople from Abia State
Nigerian footballers
Association football forwards
Enyimba F.C. players
Bridge F.C. players
Wisła Kraków players
Wawel Kraków players
Wisła Płock players
OKS Stomil Olsztyn players
Widzew Łódź players
Vasas SC players
KSZO Ostrowiec Świętokrzyski players
Elana Toruń players
Ekstraklasa players
I liga players
II liga players
III liga players
Nemzeti Bajnokság I players
Naturalized citizens of Poland
Nigerian expatriate footballers
Nigerian expatriate sportspeople in Poland
Nigerian expatriate sportspeople in Hungary
Expatriate footballers in Poland
Expatriate footballers in Hungary